Thomas Tynan (17 March 1871 – 29 September 1953) was an Irish Fianna Fáil politician and business man.

He was born 17 March 1871 in Jamestown, Ballybrittas, County Laois, son of Thomas Tynan, a farmer, and Mary Tynan (née Connell). 

He was elected to Dáil Éireann as a Fianna Fáil Teachta Dála (TD) for the Leix–Offaly constituency at the June 1927 general election. He lost his seat at the September 1927 general election having only served 3 months as a TD.

References

1871 births
1953 deaths
Fianna Fáil TDs
Members of the 5th Dáil
Politicians from County Laois